Hunter Foster (born June 25, 1969) is an American musical theatre actor, singer, librettist, playwright and director.

Career
After touring in several shows and playing on Broadway, in 2001 he was cast in his breakthrough role of Bobby Strong in Urinetown, for which he received a Lucille Lortel Award and a nomination for an Outer Critics Circle Award. In 2003, Foster starred as Seymour in the Broadway revival of Little Shop of Horrors, for which he received his first Tony Award nomination.

Foster appeared as Leo Bloom in The Producers on Broadway, Ensign Pulver in Mister Roberts at the Kennedy Center, and Ben in Modern Orthodox off-Broadway. He also starred as Molina in Kiss of the Spider Woman at the Signature Theatre in Arlington, Virginia.

Foster's writing includes the libretto for an off-Broadway 2002 musical based on the motion picture Summer of '42 and writing an adaptation of the film Bonnie and Clyde with Urinetown co-star Rick Crom. "Bonnie & Clyde: A Folktale" was workshopped in residency at the Academy for New Musical Theatre, through the ASCAP Foundation Irving Caesar Fund Fellowship, a Producer-Writer Initiative granted through the National Alliance for Musical Theatre. Foster was one of the writers for Rosie O'Donnell's 2008 NBC series Rosie Live, which was cancelled after the first episode.

Foster played the role of music producer Sam Phillips in the musical Million Dollar Quartet on Broadway at the Nederlander Theatre, which opened on April 11, 2010. Foster then portrayed Richard Hoover in the musical Little Miss Sunshine at the La Jolla Playhouse until March 27, 2011. He appeared on the ABC Family show Bunheads as Scotty Sims, the brother of main character Michelle, who is portrayed by his real-life sister Sutton Foster. He originated the role of Bud in the musical The Bridges of Madison County in 2014.

He has directed plays and musicals at the Bucks County Playhouse as well as at regional theaters. He directed Company in 2015 and Buddy: The Buddy Holly Story in June 2016 at Bucks County Playhouse.

Personal life
Foster is the older brother of actress Sutton Foster. He is married to actress and occasional co-star Jennifer Cody.

Stage credits

Awards and nominations

References

External links
Official site

1969 births
Living people
Male actors from Michigan
Male actors from Georgia (U.S. state)
University of Michigan School of Music, Theatre & Dance alumni
People from Teaneck, New Jersey
American musical theatre librettists
American male stage actors
American male musical theatre actors
American male singers
People from Troy, Michigan
Male actors from Augusta, Georgia
Musicians from Augusta, Georgia